Marco Meyerhöfer (born 18 November 1995) is a German professional footballer who plays as a right-back for Bundesliga club Greuther Fürth.

Career
Meyerhöfer made his professional debut for Greuther Fürth in the 2. Bundesliga on 28 July 2019, starting in the home match against Erzgebirge Aue which finished as a 0–2 loss.

References

External links
 
 Profile at kicker.de

1995 births
Living people
People from Bad Homburg vor der Höhe
Sportspeople from Darmstadt (region)
Footballers from Hesse
German footballers
Association football fullbacks
1. FC Saarbrücken players
SV Waldhof Mannheim players
SpVgg Greuther Fürth players
Bundesliga players
2. Bundesliga players
Regionalliga players